John Stuart Pearson (born 1 September 1963) is an English former professional footballer who played in the Football League for Sheffield Wednesday, Charlton Athletic, Leeds United, Rotherham United, Barnsley, Hull City, Carlisle United, Mansfield Town and Cardiff City. Pearson is now part of the commentary team for Sheffield Wednesday's matches on Wednesday Player along with Rob O'Neill.

As a player, he was part of the Leeds United team that won promotion to the First Division in 1990 as Second Division champions. He played for Leeds from 1986 to 1991, and although he only found the net 12 times in 99 league appearances during that time, this included a hat-trick against Sheffield United in the Second Division on 19 March 1988 in a 5–0 win at Elland Road.

References

1963 births
Living people
Footballers from Sheffield
English footballers
Association football forwards
Merthyr Tydfil F.C. players
Cardiff City F.C. players
Mansfield Town F.C. players
Carlisle United F.C. players
Hull City A.F.C. players
Barnsley F.C. players
Leeds United F.C. players
Sheffield Wednesday F.C. players
Charlton Athletic F.C. players
Rotherham United F.C. players
English Football League players